Matthew K. Rose (born 1960 in Salina, Kansas) is the former chairman and CEO of Burlington Northern Santa Fe Corp., serving in that role from 2002 to December 31, 2013.  In December 2013, Rose's role was shifted to that of executive chairman, renewing speculation he might be in line to replace Warren Buffett at Berkshire's helm.

Background
He attended the University of Missouri and is a member of Lambda Chi Alpha fraternity. Rose has a wife, Lisa, and two children.

Rose is a member of the National Executive Board of the Boy Scouts of America, the organization's governing body.

Rose was named the Railroader of the Year by Railway Age for 2010.

See also
List of chief executive officers

References

External links
BNSF
Hoover's Company Profile

21st-century American railroad executives
University of Missouri alumni
Living people
1960 births
National Executive Board of the Boy Scouts of America members
BNSF Railway people
AT&T people
People from Salina, Kansas